Hawes is a small market town in the Richmondshire district of North Yorkshire, England.

Hawes may also refer to:

Places
Hawes County, New South Wales, Australia
Hawes Township, Michigan, USA
Hawes Junction, the former name of Garsdale railway station in Cumbria, England
Hawes railway station, former railway station that served the town of Hawes in North Yorkshire, England
Ben Hawes Golf Course and Park, park located just outside Owensboro, Kentucky, USA

Other uses
Hawes (surname)
Southworth & Hawes, a 19th-century photographic firm in Boston 
USS Hawes (FFG-53), an American ship
Hawes Radio Tower was on the former Hawes Airfield at Hinkley, California, USA
Hayes
Hawnes